World Ballet Day is an annual celebration of ballet held since 2014 in October. It is a collaboration between major ballet companies around the world, which stream live video of their behind-the-scenes preparations in their respective time zones. Other companies and schools hold local celebrations. Lead co-producer is the Royal Opera House, Covent Garden, London.

The companies which contribute to the live stream are:
 The Australian Ballet
 Bolshoi Ballet
 The Royal Ballet
 The National Ballet of Canada
 San Francisco Ballet
 Royal Swedish Ballet

The date of World Ballet Day since its inception in 2014 has been:
 1 October 2014 
 1 October 2015 
 4 October 2016 
 5 October 2017 
 2 October 2018 
 23 October 2019 
 29 October 2020 
 21 October 2021
 2 November 2022

References

External links
 Official site

 ballet
October observances
 Unofficial observances
 International observances